Koppula Velama is a farming and landlord community in Uttarandhra, Andhra Pradesh.It's not a subcaste of Velama community.Most of them carry Rao and Naidu as title.They are highly educated community in the region.Most of them are into Business and Politics.

In 1972 KVs were added to backward class(severe draught, waterless, rainless lands) from Forward caste(OC),due to regional backwardness, not caste backwardness, under the leadership of Jalagam Vengala Rao Chief minister of Andhra Pradesh and Vasireddy krishnamurthy Naidu( Minister of Andhra Pradesh) who themselves hail from Velama community.

In Uttarandhra they only have been village heads(Munsabdar) from centuries.The name possibly originated from wearing hair in a knotIn Telangana they are Forward caste.Coming from warrior clan and being in backward region, community have taken lot of time adapting to modern era.Many of them migrated to banks of Krishna ,Godavari districts and Telangana region in 1900 due to draught as most of their livelihood was agriculture those days.

Notable People:

Puri Jagannadh

Kinjarapu Yerran Naidu

Dharmana Prasada Rao

Chintakayala Ayyanna Patrudu

R. Narayana Murthy

Parasuram (director)

Shiva Nirvana

References 

Social groups of Andhra Pradesh